Jazmurian District is a district (bakhsh) in Rudbar-e Jonubi County, Kerman Province, Iran. At the 2006 census, its population was 36,455, in 7,295 families.  The district has one city Zeh-e Kalut. The district has two rural districts (dehestan): Jazmurian Rural District and Kuhestan Rural District.

References 

Rudbar-e Jonubi County
Districts of Kerman Province